West Bengal Civil Service (Executive), popularly known as W.B.C.S.(Exe.), is the civil service of the Indian state of West Bengal. For the WBCS (Exe) and other comparative posts, Public Service Commission of West Bengal arranges competitive examinations in three phases every year. These phases are Preliminary, Mains and Personality Test.

WBCS Exams

Usually, online form fill up begins for WBCS in the month of November. Preliminary Exam is held in the Last week of January or first week of February at different cities of West Bengal. Post the publication of Preliminary results, Mains Exams are held in June–July in some selected institutions of Kolkata city and at the office of WBPSC. The candidates who passed in Mains are called for Personality test. At last, a selection list is issued by PSC consisting the name of qualified candidates of Mains Exams and Personality test. All these processes take up to one and a half year.

Recruitment
There are different groups in recruitment of such examination based on choice and merit of scored number. These are Group A, Group B (only for West Bengal Police Service ), Group C and Group D. The WBCS (Exe) officers belong to Group A . In general, As per record of the WBPSC the candidates with higher scores opt for WBCS (Exe), WBPS and some allied services like erstwhile WBCTS etc. as their first choice. Since 1988 some of the top ranked candidates have opted an allied service called WB commercial Tax Service (WBCTS) as their first choice due to less strenuous nature of the service and the lure of metro posting. 
Only WBCS (Exe) & WBCTS cadres are considered to be the State Civil Service by UPSC for direct promotion from WBCS and WBPS officers to IAS & IPS after 7 to 9 years of service in state police service.

Functions 
The WBCS (Exe) officers are usually appointed as deputy magistrates or deputy collectors on probation and after completion of two years of mandatory administrative training under the tutelage of Administrative Training Institute, start their career as Deputy Magistrate and Deputy Collector and Block Development (B.D.O.) Officers. They also pass order in Executive Magistrate Court and execute some sections of Criminal Procedure Code. The officers of the cadre perform the key administrative functions at different levels of various departments of the state. The highest position WBCS (Exe) officers can attain is that of Departmental secretary. Three posts of district magistrate in the State of West Bengal is reserved for these officers. WBCS (Exe) officers may also be nominated at a later stage of their career to become Indian Administrative Services (IAS) officers.

Services
Services are allotted in four groups, which are as follows:

Group A
 West Bengal Civil Services (Executive) WBCS (Exe)
 West Bengal Revenue Service (WBRS)
 West Bengal Co-operative Service (WBCoS)
 West Bengal Labour Service (WBLS)
 West Bengal Food and Supplies Service (WBF&FS)
 West Bengal Employment Service (Non-Technical) (WBES)

 Group B
 West Bengal Police Service (WBPS)

 Group C
 West Bengal Correctional Home Services
 Joint Block Development Officer (Jt. BDO)
 Deputy Assistant Director of Consumers and Fair Business Practices
 West Bengal Junior Social Welfare Service (WBJSWS)
 Assistant Canal Revenue Officer (Irrigation) (ACRO–Irrigation)
 West Bengal Sub-ordinate Land Revenue Services, Grade-I (SLRO)
 Assistant Commercial Tax Officer (ACTO)
 Chief Controller of Correctional Service (CCCS)

 Group D
 Inspector of Co-operative Societies (ICoS)
 Panchayat Development Officer (PDO)
 Rehabilitation Officer (RO)

See also
 Public Service Commission, West Bengal
 West Bengal Police Service

References

Notelist

External links
 Official Examination Scheme and Syllabus
 West Bengal Civil Service (Executive) Officers' Association
 Latest Official Scheme and Syllabus 2016
  Official Website
 

Government of West Bengal
State civil services of India
1988 establishments in West Bengal